Lady Jane is a 1986 British costume-drama romance film, directed by Trevor Nunn, written by David Edgar, and starring Helena Bonham Carter as the title character. It tells the story of Lady Jane Grey, her marriage to Lord Guildford Dudley, and her reign as the "Nine Days' Queen" following the death of Edward VI of England.

The story had previously been turned into a 1936 film, Tudor Rose, and a 1923 silent film, Lady Jane Grey; Or, The Court of Intrigue.

Plot 
The death of King Henry VIII of England throws his kingdom into chaos as his successor, Edward VI of England, is both under-age and in poor health. Anticipating the young king's imminent death from tuberculosis and anxious to keep England true to the Protestant Reformation by keeping the Catholic Princess Mary from the throne, John Dudley, 1st Duke of Northumberland, Lord President of the Council and second only to the king in power, hatches a plan to marry his second son, Lord Guildford, to Lady Jane Grey, and have the royal physician keep the young king Edward VI alive—albeit in excruciating pain—long enough to get him to name Jane his heir.

Jane is unhappy with the proposed marriage, and is forced into it through corporal punishment by her parents. At first, Jane and Guildford treat their union as a marriage of convenience, but later fall deeply in love.

After King Edward VI dies, Jane is placed on the throne. She is troubled by the questionable legality of her accession, but after consulting with Guildford, turns the tables on John Dudley and the others who thought to use her as a puppet.

After only nine days, however, Queen Jane's council abandon her because of her designs for reforming the country. The council then supports Mary, who at first imprisons Jane and Guildford.

Consumed with guilt, Jane's father, the Duke of Suffolk, raises a rebellion to restore her to the throne, presumably in concert with Thomas Wyatt's rebellion. When the rebellion fails, Queen Mary I offers to spare Jane's life if she renounces her Protestant faith. When she refuses, Jane, her father and Guildford are executed.

Cast 

 Helena Bonham Carter as Lady Jane Grey
 Cary Elwes as Lord Guildford Dudley, Jane's husband
 Jane Lapotaire as Queen Mary I of England
 Patrick Stewart as Henry Grey, 1st Duke of Suffolk, Jane's father
 Sara Kestelman as Lady Frances Brandon, Jane's mother
 Michael Hordern as Doctor Feckenham
 John Wood as John Dudley, 1st Duke of Northumberland
 Jill Bennett as Mrs. Ellen, Lady-in-Waiting
 Joss Ackland as Sir John Bridges
 Ian Hogg as Sir John Gates
 Richard Johnson as the Earl of Arundel
 Warren Saire as King Edward VI of England
 Lee Montague as Renard, Spanish Ambassador
 Richard Vernon as The Marquess of Winchester
 Adele Anderson as Lady Warwick
 Pip Torrens as Thomas
 Matthew Guinness as Doctor Owen
 Guy Henry as Lord Robert Dudley
 W. Morgan Sheppard as Executioner

Locations 
Dover Castle was used to represent the Tower of London in the film. Interior scenes of Hever Castle in Kent were used. The Long Gallery was used in the scene where Jane visits Queen Mary. The moat around Leeds Castle, also in Kent, was used in the scene where Dudley first visits Lady Jane. Several scenes were filmed at Haddon Hall in Derbyshire.

Reception 
On Rotten Tomatoes the film has an approval rating of 56% based on reviews from 9 critics.

References

External links
 
 
 Lady Jane at Turner Classic Movies
 Lady Jane at BFI

1986 romantic drama films
1980s biographical drama films
1980s historical romance films
British biographical drama films
British romantic drama films
British historical romance films
Films set in Tudor England
Films set in London
Films directed by Trevor Nunn
Paramount Pictures films
Films about child abuse
Cultural depictions of Lady Jane Grey
Cultural depictions of Mary I of England
Cultural depictions of Edward VI of England
Films shot in Kent
1980s English-language films
Cultural depictions of Lord Guildford Dudley